Parwak or Parawak is a town located in Chitral District, Khyber Pakhtunkhwa province of Pakistan.
Ice hockey tourney is held in Chitral on 4 January 2023.

Educational Instution
Aga Khan School, Parwak

References

Chitral District
Tehsils of Chitral District
Union councils of Khyber Pakhtunkhwa
Populated places in Chitral District
Union councils of Chitral District